Kannu is a village in Kastre Parish, Tartu County, Estonia. It is located just north of Võnnu. In 2000 Kannu had a population of 18.

References

Villages in Tartu County